Vigaña may refer to:

 Vigaña (Belmonte), a parish of Belmonte de Miranda municipality, Asturias, northern Spain
 Vigaña (Grado), a parish of Grado municipality, Asturias, northern Spain